The electoral district of Queenborough was an electoral district of the Tasmanian House of Assembly. It was based in the southern suburbs of Tasmania's capital city, Hobart, in particular Sandy Bay, and surrounding districts such as Cascades, Taroona and Kingston.

The seat was created as a single-member seat ahead of the Assembly's first election held in 1856. It was abolished at the 1886 election when neighbouring Kingborough became a two-member seat.

The seat was then recreated as a single-member seat at the 1897 election and was abolished when the Tasmanian parliament adopted the Hare-Clark electoral model for the entire state in 1909.

Members for Queenborough
First incarnation: 1856–1886

Second incarnation: 1897–1909

References
 
 
 Parliament of Tasmania (2006). The Parliament of Tasmania from 1956

Queenborough